The 2019 Miami Hurricanes football team (variously "Miami", "The U", "UM", "'Canes") represented the University of Miami during the 2019 NCAA Division I FBS football season. The Hurricanes were led by first-year head coach Manny Diaz and played their home games at Hard Rock Stadium, competing as a member of the Coastal Division of the Atlantic Coast Conference (ACC).

Preseason

Preseason media poll
In the preseason ACC media poll, Miami was predicted to finish in second in the Coastal Division.

Schedule

Roster

Personnel

Coaching staff

Game summaries

vs. Florida

^Neutral site game at Camping World Stadium in Orlando. The Gators are the designated home team.

at North Carolina

Bethune–Cookman

Central Michigan

Virginia Tech

Virginia

Georgia Tech

at Pittsburgh

at Florida State

Louisville

at FIU

at Duke

vs Louisiana Tech (Independence Bowl)

Players drafted into the NFL

References

Miami
Miami Hurricanes football seasons
Miami Hurricanes football